The Pacemakers were a late-1960s American funk group that consisted of bassist William "Bootsy" Collins, his older brother Phelps "Catfish" Collins on guitar, Philippé Wynne on vocals, and drummer Will Jackson (later replaced by Frankie "Kash" Waddy). 

The Pacemakers were little-known outside Cincinnati, Ohio, until 1969. After most of James Brown's band quit over a pay dispute, The Pacemakers were hired in 1970 as replacements. They formed the cornerstone of Brown's new backup band, The J.B.'s.

References
 David Mills, Larry Alexander, Thomas Stanley, and Aris Thomas, George Clinton and P-Funk: An Oral History (New York: Avon Books, 1998). 
 Patricia Romanski and Holly George-Warren (editors), The Rolling Stone Encyclopedia of Rock & Roll (New York: Fireside, 2005). 
 Rickey Vincent, Funk: The Music, The People, and The Rhythm of The One (New York: St. Martin's Griffin, 1996). 
R. J. Smith, The One: The Life and Music of James Brown (New York: Gotham Books, 2012). 

Pacesetters
Musical groups from Cincinnati